Etodroxizine (INN) (brand names Vesparax, Drimyl, Indunox, Isonox) is a first-generation antihistamine of the diphenylmethylpiperazine group which is used as a sedative/hypnotic drug in Europe and South Africa.

See also
 Hydroxyzine
 Pipoxizine

References

Primary alcohols
Ethers
H1 receptor antagonists
Hypnotics
Chlorcyclizines
Sedatives